Martti Linna (11 April 1911 – 9 February 2008) was a Finnish farmer and politician, born in Nivala. Initially a member of the Agrarian League, Linna later joined the Finnish People's Democratic League (SKDL), which he represented in the Parliament of Finland from 1958 to 1970.

References

1911 births
2008 deaths
People from Nivala
People from Oulu Province (Grand Duchy of Finland)
Finnish Lutherans
Centre Party (Finland) politicians
Finnish People's Democratic League politicians
Members of the Parliament of Finland (1958–62)
Members of the Parliament of Finland (1962–66)
Members of the Parliament of Finland (1966–70)
Finnish military personnel of World War II
20th-century Lutherans